Wuhan railway station is one of the three main passenger railway stations of Wuhan, the capital of China's Hubei Province. It is located northeast of Wuhan's East Lake, near a small lake called Yangchunhu, and is adjacent to the 3rd Ring Road. Administratively, the site is within the Wuhan's Hongshan District.

Although it shares its name with the sub-provincial city, this station was constructed rather recently; there was no Wuhan station before the construction of the Beijing-Guangzhou high speed railway, and Wuhan's main passenger railway stations were Hankou and Wuchang, representing old city names before the merger, which often confused outsiders. Completed in December 2009, the station has 11 platforms and 20 tracks. It serves the Beijing–Guangzhou–Shenzhen–Hong Kong high-speed railway, the Shanghai–Wuhan–Chengdu high-speed railway, and Zhengzhou/Jiujiang-bound passenger trains.

During the COVID-19 pandemic, Wuhan suspended all public transportation effective 10AM local time on January 23, 2020. This order  applied to all bus, metro, and ferry lines, as well as all outbound trains and flights. Wuhan railway station was thusly closed until March 28.

Design
The station was designed by Amenagement, Recherche, Pole d'Echanges (AREP), the Fourth Survey and Design Institute of China, MaP3, and SNCF-IGOA, after winning a two-phase competition in 2005. The design was inspired by the yellow crane, the symbol of Wuhan City.  The distinctive roof is intended to resemble the crane's wings, and is based on a sine curve. The building consists of nine separated parts, symbolizing China's nine provinces, plus a central thoroughfare.

Construction
Construction of the station began in September 2006, and was completed in December 2009. It was built by China State Construction Engineering Corporation, which also built the Wuhan Airport and the Beijing CCTV building.  Construction cost exceeded 14 billion Yuan (US$2 billion), including upgrades to surrounding infrastructure.

Services

Located on the main line of the Beijing–Guangzhou high-speed railway, Wuhan railway station is served by almost all trains traveling on this railway to or through Wuhan. (Only a small number of trains terminate at Hankou instead.)

Some high speed trains traveling via Wuhan on the Shanghai–Wuhan–Chengdu high-speed railway use Wuhan station as well, but most of them use Hankou instead. The Wuhan station is also served by some high speed trains traveling to and from Nanchang (on the Wuhan–Jiujiang Passenger Railway).

No "conventional" (non high-speed) trains are found in this station (due to this station is connected with high-speed line only); all of those services goes to Hankou or Wuchang stations instead.

Wuhan Metro

Wuhan Railway Station, is a station of Line 4 of Wuhan Metro. It entered revenue service on December 28, 2013. It is located in Hongshan District and it serves Wuhan railway station.

Station layout

Gallery

References

External links

 ASCE review - December 2006
 MaP3 - Photos and details

Railway stations in Wuhan
Postmodern architecture in China
Stations on the Shijiazhuang–Wuhan High-Speed Railway
Wuhan Metro stations
Line 4, Wuhan Metro
Railway stations in China opened in 2009